Barbodes sellifer, the saddled barb, is a species of cyprinid fish described in 2021. This species has not been reported sold in the aquarium trade, but where the species is present reports of them being kept by aquarists are abundant.

Previously thought to be a variant of Barbodes banksi, it and B. zakariaismaili were recently removed from B. banksi due to its unique color pattern and morphological differences that set it apart from other species of its genus.

Etymology 
Sellifer is a Latin adjective meaning 'bearing a saddle'.

Description 
Similar to other of its genus, the overall body coloration is dark yellowish brown, while the back of the fish is darker, and its underside paler. The feature that distinguishes the species is the 'saddle' on its back, a rectangular or triangular black blotch under the dorsal fin that occupies 4–6 scales and stretches down to the fourth lateral scale line. This black pattern can appear pale or darker depending on the environment.

Distribution 

It is found in Singapore, the Malay Peninsular, Indonesia, and parts of Sumatra. However, the population at Bangka Island is small, and there is an effort to breed them in captivity to increase the island population.

Habitat 
Barbodes sellifer prefers clear forest streams and pools, but is quite adaptable to other habitats like large rivers, lakes, and even swamps.

This species can sometimes be spotted intermingling with Barbodes lateristriga (spanner barb), Barbodes dunckeri (clown barb) and Rasbora elegans (two-spot rasbora).

References 

Cyprinid fish of Asia
Fish described in 2021
sellifer